Meander River, is a settlement in Upper Hay River 212, a part of the Dene Tha' Band, in northern Alberta, Canada. It located on Highway 35 (the Mackenzie Highway) and acts as a highway service centre between Alberta and the Northwest Territories.

Geography 

The plant hardiness zone of Meander River is 0B, the second lowest possible within Canada, due primarily to its northern latitude.

Employment 
Other sources of employment within the community include a provincially funded school built in 1996 and a Dene Tha' Band office.

Infrastructure 
The community is connected to the internet via Alberta SuperNet with fiber optic cabling.

Two FM Radio stations are broadcast to the reserve, CFWE 89.9 FM and CIAM 92.3 FM.

There is one school in Meander River, Upper Hay River School.

Medical care is provided by the Meander River Health Station.

Recreation 
recreational hockey/ball hockey league
recreational volleyball league  
cross-country skiing
snowmobiling
canoeing
hunting
fishing

Religion 
There is one church in Meander River, the Catholic Mission.

References

External links 
FVSD site on Meander River

Localities on Indian reserves in Alberta
Dene communities
Localities in Mackenzie County